The Shower is a Canadian comedy-drama film, directed by Gail Harvey and released in 1992. The film stars Kate Lynch as Sheila, whose baby shower for her pregnant sister is thrown into turmoil when her sister unexpectedly goes into premature labour.

The film's cast also includes Kay Tremblay, Joyce Campion, Janet-Laine Green, Krista Bridges, Brent Carver, Chas Lawther, Sean Hewitt and Shirley Douglas.

The film received three Genie Award nominations at the 13th Genie Awards: Best Actress (Green), Best Supporting Actress (Bridges) and Best Original Song (Gordon Norris and Larry Harvey for "Oh What a Fool You Made of Me"),

References

External links

1992 films
Canadian comedy-drama films
English-language Canadian films
Films shot in Toronto
Canadian pregnancy films
1990s English-language films
1990s Canadian films